Aq Daraq or Aqdaraq, also rendered as Agh Daraq, may refer to:
 Aq Daraq, Meshgin Shahr, Ardabil Province
 Aq Daraq, Nir, Ardabil Province
 Aqdaraq, Bostanabad, East Azerbaijan Province
 Aqdaraq-e Jadid, East Azerbaijan Province
 Aqdaraq-e Qadim, East Azerbaijan Province